The following is a list of known abandoned communities in Nova Scotia, Canada.

 Beaubassin
 Broughton
 Eatonville
 Goldenville (partial) 
 New France
 New Yarmouth
 Renfrew
 Roxbury

See also

 Census divisions of Nova Scotia
 List of communities in Nova Scotia

References

Ghost towns